In Tibetan Buddhism the Chokling Tersar (Tib. མཆོག་གླིང་གཏེར་གསར་ Wyl: mchog gling gter gsar.) are a collection of formerly hidden teachings or termas revealed by Chokgyur Lingpa, whose current reincarnations are Neten Chokling Rinpoche and Tsikey Chokling Rinpoche, whose foundation to propagate the Chokling Tersar is the Chokgyur Lingpa Foundation. These teachings were often revealed in combination with Jamyang Khyentse and Jamgon Kongtrul.

References

External links
Chokgyur Lingpa Foundation
Samye Institute
Phakchok Rinpoche
Chokling Tersar Foundation
 Rangjung Yeshe Gomde, Denmark, Chokling Tersar lineage
 Rangjung Yeshe Gomde, California, Chokling Tersar lineage retreat center in the USA
  Rangjung Yeshe Gomde Germany- Austria, Chokling Tersar lineage in the heart of Europe

Tibetan Buddhist texts